Ivor Davies  is a Welsh-speaking, Welsh artist born in Treharris, in November 1935. He currently lives and works in Penarth.

As a boy Davies went to Penarth County School. He studied at Cardiff College of Art and Swansea College of Art between 1952 and 1957, and then from 1959 to 1961 studied at the University of Lausanne in Switzerland. He then began teaching at the University of Wales before moving on to the University of Edinburgh, where he also completed a PhD on the Russian avant-garde. Davies finally retired from teaching at the Gwent College of Higher Education in 1988.

He was elected Vice-President of the Royal Cambrian Academy of Art in 1995 and is a member of The Welsh Group. He was made an MBE in the 2007 New Year Honours list. At the 2002 National Eisteddfod of Wales he won the Gold Medal for Fine Art.

Artwork
Davies is passionate about the culture, language and politics of Wales, which inspire his artwork. For a number of years he has sponsored the Ivor Davies Award at Y Lle Celf (Art Space in Welsh), at the National Eisteddfod of Wales, for an artwork "that conveys the spirit of activism in the struggle for language, culture and politics in Wales".

Davies' early works in the 1960s used explosives as an expression of society's destructive nature. Davies took part in the Destruction in Art Symposium in London in 1966. More recent work has included painting, installations; he has also designed and installed a mosaic of Saint David at Westminster Cathedral.

A major retrospective exhibition of his work from the 1940s onwards, Ivor Davies: Silent Explosion, opened at National Museum Cardiff in 2015. This was the largest exhibition dedicated to the work of a single contemporary artist ever held in Wales.

References

BBC 2007 New Year's Honours list 
BBC News report on Ivor Davies winning the Gold Medal in Fine Art at the National Eisteddfod of Wales 
BBC Wales article, Framing Wales 
BBC Welsh language report by the artist, Cadw'r Chwedlau'n Fyw/Keeping Mythology Alive 
BBC National Museum Wales Art Collection 
National Eisteddfod of Wales – Ivor Davies Award 
National Eisteddfod of Wales, Lle Celf 
Royal Cambrian Academy of Art overview of the artist 
Royal Cambrian Academy of Art members overview 
S4C article, Byd o Liw/World of Colour (English translation from the original Welsh) 
S4C list of contributors to their series Tywysogion/Princes 
National Eisteddfod of Wales – Gold Medal Winner 2002 
Review of art at Westminster Cathedral, including Ivor Davies' mosaic of St. David, by Germaine Greer, The Guardian, Sunday 19 September 2010 

Hard copy references
Certain Welsh Artists by Iwan Bala. Publisher: Seren (1 July 1999); (includes many references and illustrations of the artist's work on various pages throughout the book). 
Stephen Bann – "Ivor Davies – Recent Works", (touring catalogue), Clwyd County Council (1991).
Ivor Davies – "Notes towards the Definition of the Artist: Ivor Davies explores the indigenous roots of his work', Planet – The Welsh Internationalist Magazine, No.106 pp.40–48 (1994).
Jan Morris & Ivor Davies – "Ivor Davies – Legends from the White Book", (touring catalogue) Wolseley Fine Arts Ltd., London (1998).
Ivor Davies, 'Politics of the Picturesque Cambrian Landscape' (short history & background of the artist's life), in City Scape & Land Shape, a symposium; published by Cumbrian College of Art & Design, pp. 1–20 (2001).
 Welsh Artist Talking" - interview by Tony Curtis, (Seren, 2000)
 Roms, Heike. Silent Explosion: Ivor Davies and Destruction in Art. London: Occasional Papers, 2015

External Artist's Profile links
The Welsh Group 
Royal Cambrian Academy 
Art in Wales website 

1935 births
Living people
Members of The Welsh Group
People from Treharris
People from Penarth
20th-century Welsh painters
20th-century Welsh male artists
21st-century Welsh painters
21st-century Welsh male artists
Alumni of the University of Edinburgh
Welsh Eisteddfod Gold Medal winners
Members of the Order of the British Empire
Welsh contemporary artists
Welsh male painters